Croxton railway station is located on the Mernda line in Victoria, Australia. It serves the north-eastern Melbourne suburb of Northcote, and opened on 8 October 1889.

History
Opening on 8 October 1889, when the Inner Circle line was extended from North Fitzroy to Reservoir, Croxton station was named after the nearby Croxton Park Racecourse and Hotel, which in turn was named after Croxton Racecourse in Leicestershire, England.

In 1922, the station was closed to goods traffic.

On 3 July 1972, the former station building on Platform 1 was damaged by fire, with the waiting room and toilets destroyed. During the 1973/1974 financial year, the present station buildings were provided. Platform extensions also occurred during this time.

Platforms and services
Croxton has two side platforms. It is served by Mernda line trains.

Platform 1:
  all stations and limited express services to Flinders Street

Platform 2:
  all stations services to Mernda

Transport links
Yarra Trams operates two routes via Croxton station:
 : West Preston – Victoria Harbour (Docklands)
 : Bundoora RMIT – Waterfront City (Docklands)

References

External links
 Melway map at street-directory.com.au

Railway stations in Melbourne
Railway stations in Australia opened in 1889
Railway stations in the City of Darebin